Fluvius Innominatus (Latin for: unnamed river) or Central Creek is a creek in Richmond and El Cerrito, California, in western Contra Costa County. There is one main source and a secondary unnamed tributary. The creek drains into Hoffman Marsh and then flows into the bay through Point Isabel Regional Shoreline's Hoffman Channel. However, before the area was developed and as early as 1899 the creek had 11 sources which stretched far higher into the Berkeley Hills.

Notes

See also
 List of watercourses in the San Francisco Bay Area

Rivers of Contra Costa County, California
Berkeley Hills
Bodies of water of Richmond, California
Rivers of Northern California